The U.S. Post Office in Dansville, New York, United States, is located on Main Street (NY 63). It was designed and built in 1932–1933, and is one of a number of post offices in New York State designed by the Office of the Supervising Architect under James A. Wetmore.  The building is in the Colonial Revival style and features an unusual stepped parapet above the portico, blind arches above the windows, and elaborate decoration.

It was listed on the National Register of Historic Places in 1988. It is a contributing property in the Dansville Downtown Historic District.

References

External links
US Post Office - Dansville, New York - U.S. National Register of Historic Places on Waymarking.com

Dansville
Government buildings completed in 1933
Colonial Revival architecture in New York (state)
Buildings and structures in Livingston County, New York
National Register of Historic Places in Livingston County, New York
Historic district contributing properties in New York (state)